Riseriellus is a monotypic genus of nemerteans belonging to the family Lineidae. The only species is Riseriellus occultus.

The species is found in Northwestern Europe.

References

Lineidae
Monotypic nemertea genera
Nemertea genera